Krimmena Mistika (Greek: Κρυμμένα Μυστικά) is an album by Greek musician Giannis Ploutarhos, released in 2006 by Minos EMI.

Track listing

References

2005 albums
Giannis Ploutarhos albums
Greek-language albums
Minos EMI albums